Howell Township is a township in Monmouth County, in the U.S. state of New Jersey. It is located in the New York metropolitan area and has been a steadily growing bedroom community of New York City. As of the 2020 United States census, the township's population was 53,537, its highest decennial count ever and an increase of 2,462 (+4.8%) from the 2010 census count of 51,075, which in turn reflected an increase of 2,172 (+4.4%) from the 48,903 counted at the 2000 census.

History
Howell Township was incorporated as a township by an act of the New Jersey Legislature on February 23, 1801, from portions of Shrewsbury Township. Portions of the township were taken to form Brick Township in the newly created Ocean County (February 15, 1850), Wall Township (March 7, 1851) and Farmingdale (April 8, 1903). The township was named for Richard Howell, who served from 1794 to 1801 as the third Governor of New Jersey.

Founded in 1822 by engineer and philanthropist James P. Allaire, the Howell Works provided iron for Allaire Iron Works, which was a leading supplier of iron in the 19th century. Allaire Village was a bustling mill town at the height of the mining operations and it has been preserved as Allaire State Park, which is in Howell Township and Wall Township.

Some scenes for the War of the Worlds 2005 remake were filmed here, and a neighborhood called Ardena Acres was recreated as a set and left standing in Universal Studios Hollywood.

In June 2017, two separate tornadoes, both rated EF0 on the Enhanced Fujita scale, struck minutes and miles apart. The first one struck the Fort Plains area, damaging a Home Depot, Chase Bank, a strip mall, and a local ice cream parlor. The second one struck a park in the Oak Glen area.

Geography

According to the United States Census Bureau, the township had a total area of 61.21 square miles (158.54 km2), including 60.27 square miles (156.10 km2) of land and 0.94 square miles (2.44 km2) of water (1.54%).

Howell was formed from territory taken from Shrewsbury Township under an act of the New Jersey General Assembly passed February 23, 1801. The township, as formed, included in addition to its present area all of what is now Wall Township, Lakewood Township, Brick Township, and all the boroughs along the Atlantic Ocean from Barnegat Inlet of the Shark River Inlet at Belmar.

Ramtown (with a 2010 Census population of 6,242) is an unincorporated community and census-designated place (CDP) located within Howell Township.

Other unincorporated communities, localities and place names located partially or completely within the township include Adelphia, Ardena, Ardmore Estates, Bergerville, Candlewood, Collingwood Park, Fairfield, Fort Plains, Freewood Acres, Jerseyville, Lake Club, Land of Pines, Larrabees, Lippencotts Corner, Lower Squankum, Matthews, Maxim, Oak Glen, Parkway Pines, Salem Hill, Shacks Corner, Southard, Squankum, West Farms, Winston Park, Wyckoff Mills and Yellow Brook.

The township completely surrounds Farmingdale, making it part of 21 pairs of "doughnut towns" in the state, where one municipality entirely surrounds another. The township borders Colts Neck Township, Freehold Township and Wall Township in Monmouth County; and Brick Township, Jackson Township and Lakewood Township in Ocean County.

Ecology
According to the A. W. Kuchler U.S. potential natural vegetation types, Howell Township, New Jersey would have an Appalachian Oak (104) vegetation type with an Eastern Hardwood Forest (25) vegetation form.

Major bodies of water
The township is uniquely located in the center of the state New Jersey, located on a ridge within Central New Jersey. As such, northern sections of the township fall within the hillier terrain and fertile soil found in the Inner coastal plain, while southern sections of the township fall within the more flat terrain and sandier soil found in the Outer coastal plain. The township is located within the sphere of influence of the Jersey Shore, while also being located relatively near the Raritan Bayshore, the Raritan Valley, and the Pine Barrens. Notable bodies of water inside the township include:

Lakes
Manasquan Reservoir
Aldrich Lake
Echo Lake
Lake Louise

Rivers
Manasquan River (Raritan Basin Watershed)
Metedeconk River (Barnegat Bay Watershed)
North Branch Metedeconk River
South Branch Metedeconk River
Swimming River (Navesink River Watershed)
Mine Brook

Demographics

Most common ancestries in Howell Township are 
Italian: 23.8%, 
Irish: 18.7%, 
German: 12.7%, 
Other groups: 11.3%, 
Polish: 7.7%, 
English: 4.9% and 
Russian: 3.0%.

The township is also home to a small, but notable, Kalmyk American community located in the Freewood Acres neighborhood.

2010 census

The Census Bureau showed that in 2010 median household income was $89,287 and the median family income was $102,015. Males had a median income of $71,499 versus $54,308 for females. The per capita income for the township was $35,489. About 4.5% of families and 5.2% of the population were below the poverty line, including 4.5% of those under age 18 and 8.8% of those age 65 or over.

2000 census
As of the 2000 United States census there were 48,903 people, 16,063 households, and 13,011 families residing in the township. The population density was 802.8 people per square mile (310.0/km2). There were 16,572 housing units at an average density of 272.1 per square mile (105.0/km2). The racial makeup of the township was 89.99% White, 3.56% African American, 0.12% Native American, 3.58% Asian, 0.01% Pacific Islander, 1.29% from other races, and 1.45% from two or more races. Hispanic or Latino of any race were 5.34% of the population.

The most common first ancestry group cited by Howell residents in the 2000 Census was German (17.7%), English (12.7%), Irish (11.5%), United States or American (9.9%), Polish (6.6%), French (except Basque) (4.0%) and Italian (2.7%).

There were 16,063 households, out of which 47.1% had children under the age of 18 living with them, 69.4% were married couples living together, 8.6% had a female householder with no husband present, and 19.0% were non-families. 15.4% of all households were made up of individuals, and 7.1% had someone living alone who was 65 years of age or older. The average household size was 3.04 and the average family size was 3.42.

In the township the population was spread out, with 30.9% under the age of 18, 6.0% from 18 to 24, 32.8% from 25 to 44, 21.6% from 45 to 64, and 8.8% who were 65 years of age or older. The median age was 36 years. For every 100 females, there were 95.3 males. For every 100 females age 18 and over, there were 91.7 males.

The median income for a household in the township in 2000 was $68,069, and the median income for a family was $74,623. Males had a median income of $55,349 versus $34,722 for females. The per capita income for the township was $26,143. About 3.1% of families and 4.2% of the population were below the poverty line, including 4.2% of those under age 18 and 6.4% of those age 65 or over.

Economy

Agriculture

Despite suburbanization in recent years, the township's agricultural roots have been preserved. There are numerous crop farms, thoroughbred farms, and nurseries in the township. Some notable farms in the township include Calgo Gardens, Twin Pond Farm, Kauffman Farms, Landex Nursery, and JMJ Farm.

Commerce

The township is home to numerous shopping centers, particularly on U.S. 9, including Aldrich Plaza, Adelphia Plaza, Greenleaf at Howell, Howell Commons, Lanes Mill Marketplace, and Regal Plaza.

Other shopping destinations near Howell, including the Freehold Raceway Mall in Freehold Township, Jackson Premium Outlets in Jackson Township and Jersey Shore Premium Outlets in Tinton Falls. Neighboring Farmingdale acts as a 'downtown' for the surrounding Howell Township. Nearby Asbury Park (on the shore) and Freehold Borough (the county seat) are also regional 'downtowns' for the township.

The Howell Chamber of Commerce, established in 1957, serves to promote Howell businesses. The Chamber of Commerce works to advocate for the diverse Howell business community, provides extensive benefits to its members, and creates a Community amongst the members.

Parks and recreation
Manasquan Reservoir offers nature and exercise related activities such as fishing, bird watching, jogging, biking, dog walking. The reservoir also has a nature exhibit where people can go see the local wildlife.

Alfred C. Sauer Park at Echo Lake offers a dock for fishing and kayaking, a nature trail and a pavilion overlooking the lake which can be rented. There is no swimming but there are grills and picnic tables as well as a playground. In 2014, the township renamed the park in memory of Alfred C. Sauer, an environmentalist who worked to preserve the park and other natural environments in the township.

Government

Local government 

Howell Township operates within the Faulkner Act, formally known as the Optional Municipal Charter Law, under the Council-Manager form of municipal government. The township is one of 42 municipalities (of the 564) statewide that use this form of government. The governing body is comprised of the Mayor and the four-member Township Council, whose members are chosen in partisan voting to four-year terms of office on a staggered basis, with elections held in even-numbered years as part of the November general election. Three council seats are up together and two years later there is one council seat and the mayoral seat up for election at the same time. At a reorganization meeting held after each election, the council selects a deputy mayor from among its members.

, the Mayor of Howell Township is Democrat Theresa Berger, whose term of office ends December 31, 2024. Members of the Howell Township Council are Deputy Mayor Pamela J. Richmond (R, term on council and as deputy mayor ends 2022), John Bonevich (D, 2022), Evelyn Malsbury-O'Donnell (R, 2024) and Thomas Russo (R, 2022).

Former mayor Robert Walsh was named to fill the seat vacated by William Gotto after Gotto took office as mayor in January 2013. Walsh's appointed portion of the term ended at the November 2013 general election, though Walsh was the only candidate to submit a petition to serve the balance of the term through December 2014.

The Township Manager is Joseph Clark. Since August 2022, the Chief of the Howell Police Department is John Storrow.

Federal, state and county representation 
Howell Township is located in the 4th Congressional District and is part of New Jersey's 30th state legislative district.

 

Monmouth County is governed by a Board of County Commissioners comprised of five members who are elected at-large to serve three year terms of office on a staggered basis, with either one or two seats up for election each year as part of the November general election. At an annual reorganization meeting held in the beginning of January, the board selects one of its members to serve as Director and another as Deputy Director. , Monmouth County's Commissioners are
Commissioner Director Thomas A. Arnone (R, Neptune City, term as commissioner and as director ends December 31, 2022), 
Commissioner Deputy Director Susan M. Kiley (R, Hazlet Township, term as commissioner ends December 31, 2024; term as deputy commissioner director ends 2022),
Lillian G. Burry (R, Colts Neck Township, 2023),
Nick DiRocco (R, Wall Township, 2022), and 
Ross F. Licitra (R, Marlboro Township, 2023). 
Constitutional officers elected on a countywide basis are
County clerk Christine Giordano Hanlon (R, 2025; Ocean Township), 
Sheriff Shaun Golden (R, 2022; Howell Township) and 
Surrogate Rosemarie D. Peters (R, 2026; Middletown Township).

Politics
As of March 2011, there were a total of 33,176 registered voters in Howell Township, of which 6,622 (20.0%) were registered as Democrats, 7,744 (23.3%) were registered as Republicans and 18,798 (56.7%) were registered as Unaffiliated. There were 12 voters registered to other parties.

In the 2020 presidential election, Republican Donald Trump received 57.8% of the vote (18,491 cast), ahead of Democrat Joe Biden with 40.7% of the vote (13,004 votes), and other candidates with 1.5% (469 votes) among the 31,964 votes cast by the township's voters. In the 2016 presidential election, Republican Donald Trump received 60.4% of the vote (15,808 cast), ahead of Democrat Hillary Clinton with 36.0% of the vote (9,430 votes), and other candidates with 3.5% (923 votes), among the 26,161 votes cast by the township's voters. In the 2012 presidential election, Republican Mitt Romney received 55.4% of the vote (12,529 cast), ahead of Democrat Barack Obama with 43.2% (9,762 votes), and other candidates with 1.4% (310 votes), among the 22,772 ballots cast by the township's 34,737 registered voters (171 ballots were spoiled), for a turnout of 65.6%. In the 2008 presidential election, Republican John McCain received 54.8% of the vote (13,854 cast), ahead of Democrat Barack Obama with 42.7% (10,790 votes) and other candidates with 1.2% (300 votes), among the 25,278 ballots cast by the township's 34,490 registered voters, for a turnout of 73.3%. In the 2004 presidential election, Republican George W. Bush received 59.0% of the vote (13,579 ballots cast), outpolling Democrat John Kerry with 39.1% (8,990 votes) and other candidates with 0.7% (219 votes), among the 23,015 ballots cast by the township's 31,549 registered voters, for a turnout percentage of 73.0.

In the 2017 gubernatorial election, Republican Kim Guadagno received 60.5% of the vote (8,481 cast), ahead of Democrat Phil Murphy with 36.7% (5,137 votes), and other candidates with 2.8% (391 votes), among the 14,009 cast by the township's voters. In the 2013 gubernatorial election, Republican Chris Christie received 73.4% of the vote (9,999 cast), ahead of Democrat Barbara Buono with 25.2% (3,426 votes), and other candidates with 1.4% (189 votes), among the 13,788 ballots cast by the township's 34,992 registered voters (174 ballots were spoiled), for a turnout of 39.4%. In the 2009 gubernatorial election, Republican Chris Christie received 68.7% of the vote (11,187 ballots cast), ahead of Democrat Jon Corzine with 24.7% (4,023 votes), Independent Chris Daggett with 5.4% (886 votes) and other candidates with 0.8% (127 votes), among the 16,287 ballots cast by the township's 33,461 registered voters, yielding a 48.7% turnout.

Education 

The Howell Township Public Schools serve students in pre-kindergarten through eighth grade. As of the 2020–21 school year, the district, comprised of 12 schools, had an enrollment of 5,409 students and 494.5 classroom teachers (on an FTE basis), for a student–teacher ratio of 10.9:1. Schools in the district (with 2020–21 enrollment data from the National Center for Education Statistics) are five K-2 elementary schools, five 3-5 elementary schools and two middle schools for grades 6-8: 
Adelphia Elementary School (345 students; in grades K-2), 
Aldrich Elementary School (378; 3-5), 
Ardena Elementary School (324; 3-5), 
Greenville Elementary School (318; K-2), 
Griebling Elementary School (255; K-2), 
Land O' Pines Elementary School (486; PreK-2), 
Memorial Elementary Elementary School (258; 3-5), 
Newbury Elementary School (372; 3-5), 
Ramtown Elementary School (325; 3-5), 
Taunton Elementary School (362; K-2), 
Howell Township Middle School North (1,116; 6-8) and 
Howell Township Middle School South (868; 6-8).

Students in public school for ninth through twelfth grades attend either Howell High School, Freehold Township High School or Colts Neck High School (depending on home address), as part of the Freehold Regional High School District (FRHSD). The Freehold Regional High School District also serves students from Colts Neck Township, Englishtown, Farmingdale, Freehold Borough, Freehold Township, Manalapan Township and Marlboro. Students from Howell can apply to participate in one of the Freehold Regional Learning Center programs within these six schools. The FRHSD board of education has nine members, who are elected to three-year terms from each of the constituent districts. Each member is allocated a fraction of a vote that totals to nine points, with Howell allocated two members, who each have 1.0 votes. Students from Howell may also apply to attend one of the Monmouth County Vocational School District schools throughout Monmouth County.

Mother Seton Academy, a Catholic School for grades Pre-K–8, which operates under the auspices of the Roman Catholic Diocese of Trenton, is in the township. It formed in 2019 by the merger of St. Veronica and St. Aloysius schools; the former was in Howell and the latter was in Jackson Township.

Monmouth Academy (formerly Lakewood Prep School) was a private, nonsectarian, coeducational day school located in Howell Township, that served 180 students in pre-kindergarten through twelfth grade.

Media
The Asbury Park Press provides daily news coverage of the town. The government of Howell provides columns and commentary to The Howell Times, which is one of seven weekly papers from Micromedia Publications.

Points of interest 
 St. Alexander Nevsky Cathedral is a Russian Orthodox Church cathedral, originally established in 1936 and decorated with Byzantine-style frescos, that operates under the jurisdiction of the Russian Orthodox Church Outside Russia.
The Mackenzie Museum and Library was the home of William Prickitt who led the 25th Regiment of the U.S. Colored Troops during the Civil War.

Infrastructure

Transportation

Roads and highways

Several major highways traverse through Howell Township. These include Interstate 195, U.S. Route 9, Route 33 and Route 34. Major county routes that traverse through Howell Township include County Route 524 (Elton-Adelphia Road), County Route 547 (Lakewood-Farmingdale Road/Asbury Road) and County Route 549 (Herbertsville Road).

The Garden State Parkway passes through neighboring Wall Township and is accessible with Interstate 195 and Route 33 at interchanges 98 and 100. Further out west, the New Jersey Turnpike is accessible with Interstate 195 and Route 33 at interchanges 7A and 8.

Public transportation
NJ Transit provides bus transportation to communities along U.S. Route 9 from Lakewood to Old Bridge, and to the Port Authority Bus Terminal in New York City via the 131, 135 and 139 bus routes, to Newark Liberty International Airport and the rest of Newark on the 67 route, to Jersey City on the 64 and 67 routes, and with local service on the 836 route. Bus service is available from Route 9 to the Financial District in Lower Manhattan via the Academy Bus Line. There are two commuter parking lots available exclusively for residents of Howell Township, at the Aldrich Park & Ride in the Land of Pines neighborhood, and the Howell Park & Ride in the Adelphia neighborhood.

The Monmouth Ocean Middlesex Line a proposed NJ Transit project which would connect Monmouth, Ocean and Middlesex counties to the rest of the system's rail network. The township would be a potential stop for the 'MOM' Line. As of now, Howell offers taxi services to and from the Belmar train station, the closest train station to the township. Other nearby train stations include Aberdeen-Matawan, Asbury Park, Hamilton, and Long Branch.

Monmouth Executive Airport in Farmingdale supplies short-distance flights to surrounding areas and is the closest air transportation service.

Cycleways, including the Edgar Felix Bikeway, connect to Manasquan and the beach, as well as other points of interest.

Healthcare
Most of Howell Township is served by the CentraState Healthcare System, which is affiliated with Rutgers Robert Wood Johnson Medical School. The main hospital campus is located in neighboring Freehold Township. The facility has 287 beds and is the county's fourth-largest employer. The next closest major hospitals to the township are Monmouth Medical Center's Southern Campus in nearby Lakewood, Jersey Shore University Medical Center in nearby Neptune, and the Hamilton division of Robert Wood Johnson University Hospital.

Notable people

People who were born in, residents of, or otherwise closely associated with Howell Township include:

 Jay Alders (born 1973), artist, photographer and graphic designer, who is best known for his original surf art paintings
 Bonnie Bernstein (born 1970), sportscaster for ESPN/ABC Sports
 Jimmy Blewett (born 1980), professional driver in the NASCAR Whelen Modified Tour; brother of John Blewett III
 John Blewett III (1973–2007), driver who competed in the NASCAR Whelen Modified Tour; brother of Jimmy Blewett
 Cody Calafiore (born 1990), actor and model who was the runner-up on Big Brother 16 in 2014
 Sopan Deb (born 1988), journalist who works as a culture reporter for The New York Times
 Anthony DeSclafani (born 1990), MLB pitcher for the Cincinnati Reds
 Charles Asa Francis (1855–1934), politician who served in both the New Jersey General Assembly and New Jersey Senate
 Doug French (born 1959), competed in NASCAR and the ARCA Menards Series from 1985 to 2001
 Sandje Ivanchukov (1960–2007), professional soccer player who was drafted out of high school by the Tampa Bay Rowdies
 Rob Kinelski (born 1981), four-time Grammy award-winning sound engineer, most noted for his work with Billie Eilish & former bass player & founding member of indie rock band Union Spirit
 Nick LaBrocca (born 1984), midfielder for Colorado Rapids
 Austin H. Patterson (died 1905), who served on the Howell Township Committee, the Monmouth County, New Jersey Board of Chosen Freeholders and the New Jersey State Assembly
 Tom Pelphrey (born 1982), actor who has appeared in the daytime soap Guiding Light, as Jonathan Randall
 Frankie Perez (born 1989), mixed martial artist specializing in Brazilian jiu-jitsu who has competed in Ultimate Fighting Championship
 Amy Polumbo (born 1984), Miss New Jersey 2007
 Vinnie Roslin (1947–2012), bass guitarist who was an original member of Steel Mill, an early Bruce Springsteen band that included Danny Federici, Vini Lopez and Steve Van Zandt, who would later become members of Springsteen's E Street Band
 Rich Skrosky (born 1964), football coach
 Ryan Spadola (born 1991), wide receiver who has played with the New York Jets and Miami Dolphins
 Denny Walling (born 1954), former Major League Baseball player

References

External links 

Howell Township website
Howell Township Public Schools

School Data for the Howell Township Public Schools, National Center for Education Statistics
Howell Twp Public School Issues community message board
Howell High School
Colts Neck High School
Freehold Regional High School District

Howell Chamber of Commerce
Community message board for news and discussion of Howell issues and events
Local website for news and information concerning Howell Township

 
1801 establishments in New Jersey
Faulkner Act (council–manager)
Populated places established in 1801
Townships in Monmouth County, New Jersey